Jason Francesco Schwartzman (born June 26, 1980) is an American actor and musician.

Schwartzman made his film debut in Wes Anderson's 1998 film Rushmore, and has gone on to appear in six other Anderson films: The Darjeeling Limited (2007), Fantastic Mr. Fox (2009), Moonrise Kingdom (2012), The Grand Budapest Hotel (2014), Isle of Dogs (2018), and The French Dispatch (2021). His other film roles include Spun (2003), I Heart Huckabees (2004), Marie Antoinette (2006), and Klaus (2019). Schwartzman starred in the television series Bored to Death (2009–11) and appeared in the fourth season of the FX anthology series Fargo (2020). He was an executive producer on the Amazon Prime show Mozart in the Jungle (2014–18), a series he also acted in.

Schwartzman has released three albums through his solo project Coconut Records, having previously been drummer in the rock band Phantom Planet.

Early life
Jason Francesco Schwartzman was born in Los Angeles on June 26, 1980, the son of actress Talia Shire (née Coppola) and film producer Jack Schwartzman. He has described his ancestry as being "half-Polish Jewish and half-Italian." His younger brother, Robert Schwartzman, is also an actor and musician. His paternal half-siblings are Stephanie and cinematographer John Schwartzman, while his maternal half-brother is Matthew Shire. As a member of the Coppola family, many of his relatives are also involved in the entertainment industry—he is the nephew of filmmaker Francis Ford Coppola and opera conductor Anton Coppola; the cousin of actor Nicolas Cage and filmmakers Sofia Coppola, Roman Coppola, and Christopher Coppola; and the grandson of Coppola family matriarch Italia Coppola (née Pennino) and composer Carmine Coppola. He attended Windward School in the Mar Vista neighborhood of Los Angeles.

Career

Acting
Schwartzman began his acting career in 1998 when, at the age of 18, he starred in Wes Anderson's Rushmore. In 2000, he had a guest role in the short-lived series Freaks and Geeks. In 2001, he starred in CQ, a film by his cousin Roman Coppola. In 2002, he starred in the comedy film Slackers, and in 2003 headlined the drama Spun. In 2004, he starred in I Heart Huckabees, and Shopgirl in 2005. He also appeared in various television shows, such as Cracking Up. In 2006, he starred in Marie Antoinette under the direction of his cousin, Sofia Coppola, in which he appeared as King Louis XVI.

Schwartzman made a cameo appearance as Ringo Starr in the biopic spoof Walk Hard: The Dewey Cox Story. In 2009, he appeared as C-list television star Mark in Funny People. He also voiced Ash Fox in Wes Anderson's animated film Fantastic Mr. Fox, which he described as "the best movie [he's] ever been a part of". He starred in the HBO show Bored to Death, in which he played a writer who moonlights as a private detective and puts himself up for hire on Craigslist. In 2009, he starred in The Marc Pease Experience. In 2010, he played Gideon Graves in the film Scott Pilgrim vs. The World, the movie adaptation of the comics by Bryan Lee O'Malley.

In 2011, Schwartzman made a cameo appearance as Vincent van Gogh in the Beastie Boys short film Fight for Your Right Revisited. In 2013, he made a cameo appearance as himself in an episode of the television show Key & Peele. In 2014, he played himself in the Tim & Eric's Bedtime Stories episode "The Endorsement". In 2020, he starred as Italian crime boss Josto Fadda in the fourth season of the FX anthology series Fargo.

Music
Prior to acting, Schwartzman was the drummer and a songwriter for the band Phantom Planet. He appeared in the music video for the rock remix of "It's All About the Benjamins" by Puff Daddy, and contributed to Ben Lee's 2005 album Awake Is the New Sleep. In 2007, he created the indie rock solo act Coconut Records. The first album, entitled Nighttiming, was produced by Michael Einziger and features a cover photo from Roman Coppola. The album was first released on iTunes on March 20, 2007. It had musical contributions by members of Incubus, as well as appearances by actresses Zooey Deschanel and Kirsten Dunst and Schwartzman's brother Robert. His second album, Davy, was released on iTunes on January 20, 2009. Schwartzman performed the musical score for Funny People and the theme song for Bored to Death. He has also written tracks for Smallville and Slackers. Schwartzman also played the drums on Phoenix's rendition of The Beach Boys' song "Alone on Christmas Day" in 2015. The song was featured in Bill Murray's Netflix special, A Very Murray Christmas.

Schwartzman's work has also been featured in many films and television programs. In 2009, he composed the theme song to his HBO series Bored to Death, in which he also starred, under his Coconut Records title. That same year, he also contributed to the film score to the film Funny People with composer Michael Andrews. The original soundtrack is downloadable, as well as available in vinyl LP, on Coconut Records' official Cinder Block store. His song, "Microphone" was featured in the 2012 coming of age comedy, LOL.

Personal life
Schwartzman married his long-time girlfriend, Brady Cunningham, an art and design director, at their home in the San Fernando Valley on July 11, 2009. Their first child, a daughter, was born in December 2010. Their second daughter was born in June 2014.

In 2006, Schwartzman described himself as "basically a vegan". In 2009, he was named one of the "Top 10 Most Stylish Men in America" by GQ magazine. In 2011, he narrated a video called What to Eat: The Environmental Impacts of Our Food for Farm Sanctuary.

Filmography

Film

Television

Video games

Composer

Discography

Studio albums

Singles
Microphone (2008)
Bored to Death (2010) – theme of the show

Other appearances
"West Coast" is played in the movie Cloverfield during the party scene
"Summer Day" is included on Music from and Inspired by Spider-Man 3
"Wires", "I Am Young", and "Nighttiming" are included on Funny People: Original Motion Picture Soundtrack (2009)
"It's Christmas" is included on the digital-only promotional release The Christmas Gig (2010) released by Target
"West Coast" appears in the end of The O.C season 4, episode 10
"Is This Sound Okay?" appears in Palo Alto

References

External links

Wunderkammer Magazine Retrospective on Schwarzman, 2009
Schwartzman Interview on The Hour with George Stroumboulopoulos
 Schwartzman's Guest DJ Set on KCRW KCRW Guest DJ Set
Young Baby Records official site
Coconut Records at Rhapsody
Coconut Records at Facebook
Coconut Records at Myspace

1980 births
20th-century American male actors
21st-century American male actors
21st-century American drummers
American film score composers
American male film actors
American male screenwriters
American male television actors
American male voice actors
American people of Polish-Jewish descent
American writers of Italian descent
Coppola family
Indie rock musical groups from California
Living people
Male actors from Los Angeles
American male film score composers
Musicians from Los Angeles
Phantom Planet members
Screenwriters from California
Writers from Los Angeles